{{DISPLAYTITLE:C24H26N2O2}}
The molecular formula C24H26N2O2 (molar mass: 374.47 g/mol, exact mass: 374.1994 u) may refer to:

Carmoxirole
Evocalcet
Furanylfentanyl

Molecular formulas